Katherine Magdalene Rose (formerly known as k.m. yarian) is a transgender author and social activist from San Francisco. She was formerly a member of the Episcopal religious community known as the Brotherhood of Saint Gregory before coming out publicly as transgender in 2016. Rose is the author of In Love and Service Bound: The First Forty Years of the Brotherhood of Saint Gregory; The Skillfulness of Shepherds: Gregorian Reflections on the Spiritual Life and co-author of Equipping the Saints – two volumes currently used in the Brotherhood's formation program; and For the Balance of My Natural Life – a reflection on Life Vows in the Gregorian Way. She is also the subject of the award-winning documentary "Changing Habits" by Sara Needham, and has appeared in the nationally released via media series produced by Every Voice Network, an advocacy organization in the Episcopal Church for progressive causes.

As an advocate of the Progressive Christian movement, Rose has been involved with such organizations as Social Redemption, a technology working group dedicated to reassertion of progressive Christian values in the public sphere, and Every Voice Network which co-hosted a major conference in Washington DC in October 2005.

Rose’s work in San Francisco includes spiritual advocacy for members of the transgender community and political activism for LGBT* causes. She is noted for her advocacy of Christian anarchism. Her book "How To Be A Disciple and Digital" (as Yarian), a rudimentary ethics of faith on social media, was released in February 2018 by Church Publishing, Inc.

Her first full length poetry collection, “tribe: fire-songs”, a series of poems reflecting on gender and sensuality was released on Amazon in February 2019. Another full length poetry edition, “winter breviary”, a reflection on post modern spiritual anxiety and the capacity for human violence, was also released shortly after. The following year, she released her most recent collection of poetry lauding the feminine title "she who willows among thorns."

Personal life
Rose married Anthony Anchundo in 2008, just before the passage of Proposition 8 banned same-sex marriages in California.

On October 11, 2017, Rose publicly came out as transgender and non-binary for National Coming Out Day.

References

External links
 Brotherhood of Saint Gregory
 Sisters of Saint Gregory
 Province IV of the Brotherhood of Saint Gregory
 Province VIII of the Brotherhood of Saint Gregory
 

Living people
Non-binary activists
People from San Francisco
21st-century American Episcopalians
21st-century American writers
American LGBT rights activists
LGBT Anglicans
Transgender rights activists
Year of birth missing (living people)
Transgender non-binary people
American non-binary writers